Kona is a moku or district on the Big Island of Hawaii in the State of Hawaii, known for its Kona coffee and the location of the Ironman World Championship Triathlon. In the current system of administration of Hawaii County, the moku of Kona is divided into North Kona District (Kona ‘Akau) and South Kona District (Kona Hema). The term "Kona" is sometimes used to refer to its largest town, Kailua-Kona. Other towns in Kona include Kealakekua, Keauhou, Holualoa, Hōnaunau and Honalo.

Description 
In the Hawaiian language, kona means leeward or dry side of the island, as opposed to ko‘olau which means windward or the wet side of the island. In the times of Ancient Hawaiʻi, Kona was the name of the leeward district on each major island. In Hawai‘i, the Pacific anticyclone provides moist prevailing northeasterly winds to the Hawaiian islands, resulting in rain when the winds contact the windward landmass of the islands – the winds subsequently lose their moisture and travel on to the leeward (or kona) side of the island.  When this pattern reverses, it can produce a Kona storm from the west. Kona has cognates with the same meaning in other Polynesian languages.  In Tongan, the equivalent cognate would be tonga; for windward, the associated cognate would be tokelau.

Kona is the home of the Ironman World Championship Triathlon, which is held each year in October in Kailua-Kona.
The Kealakekua Bay State Historical Park marks the place where Captain James Cook was killed in 1779. Puʻuhonua o Hōnaunau National Historical Park and Honokohau Settlement and Kaloko-Honokohau National Historical Park are in Kona.

The volcanic slopes of Hualālai and Mauna Loa in the Kona district provide an ideal microclimate for growing coffee. Kona coffee is considered one of the premium specialty coffees of the world.

Kona is the home of one of the main bases of the international Christian mission organization YWAM, and the University of the Nations, first founded there.

In popular culture 
 The region served as the basis of the Beach Boys' song "Kona Coast" from their 1978 album M.I.U. Album.
 Asteroid 284891 Kona, discovered by astronomers at the ESA Optical Ground Station in 2009, was named after the Hawaiian district. The official  was published by the Minor Planet Center on 16 January 2014.

Gallery

Further reading 
 Juvik, Sonia P., 1998, Atlas of Hawaii, University of Hawaii Press, 
 Kona Historical Society, 1997, A Guide to Old Kona, University of Hawaii Press,

References

External links 
 Kona Historical Society web site
 Kona Kohala Chamber of Commerce web site
 North Kona shoreline access map at Hawaii County web site
 South Kona shoreline access map at Hawaii County web site

Districts of Hawaii County, Hawaii
Kona District